Qatar National Bank (QNB Group) is a Qatari multinational commercial bank headquartered in Doha, Qatar.  It was founded in 1964 and currently has subsidiaries and associates in 31 countries spanning three continents. The bank's ownership is evenly divided between the Qatar Investment Authority and members of the public.

History
QNB was founded on 6 June 1964 as the country's first domestically-owned commercial bank. It had 35 employees in its first year and was initially headquartered in a government-owned building in Qatar's capital city, Doha. The two currencies in circulation at the time were the Indian rupee and British pound. As Qatar's population continued increasing through the century, QNB started establishing branches in other parts of the country.

In 1974, the first branches outside of Doha were opened in Al Khor and Mesaieed. The bank installed its first ATMs in 1988 in its Doha branches, and, in the next year, introduced VISA cards for its clients. By 2015, it had established 76 branches in Qatar. Qatar National Bank (QNB) controls an 82.59 percent stake in Bank QNB Indonesia.

For the nine months ended September 30, 2020, net profit was QR 9.5 billion (US$ 2.6 billion). Total assets also increased by 8% since September 30, 2019, to reach QR986 billion (US$271 billion).

Data leak
A leak of data from the bank was made public in April 2016. The leaked files were published on Cryptome.

The files contained the personal data of the bank's clients, as well as credit card information and passwords. The leak was divided into folders for individual groups of clients; these included Qatar's Al Thani family, state security officials, staff of Al Jazeera Media Network, the news organisation endowed by the Qatari state, former Qatari national intelligence agency Mukhabarat, UK's currently active foreign intelligence counterpart MI6 and their nondescript French and Polish counterparts.

See also
 List of largest banks

References

Banks of Qatar
Banks established in 1964
1964 establishments in Qatar
Qatari brands
Companies based in Doha
Multinational companies headquartered in Qatar
Companies listed on the Qatar Stock Exchange